Beaver Line may refer to:
 Beaver Line (railway), see Sharpness Branch Line
 Beaver Line (shipping), a Canadian shipping line of the Canada Shipping Company, owner of SS Mount Temple